Valerio Grond (born 26 October 2000) is a Swiss cross-country skier. He competed in the sprint at the 2022 Winter Olympics.

Cross-country skiing results
All results are sourced from the International Ski Federation (FIS).

Olympic Games

Distance reduced to 30 km due to weather conditions.

World Championships

World Cup

Season standings

Team podiums
 1 podium – (1 )

References

External links

2000 births
Living people
Swiss male cross-country skiers
Cross-country skiers at the 2022 Winter Olympics
Olympic cross-country skiers of Switzerland
People from Davos
Tour de Ski skiers
Sportspeople from Graubünden
21st-century Swiss people